Association Sportive d’El Khroub, known as AS Khroub or simply ASK for short, is an Algerian football club in the city of El Khroub in Constantine Province. Founded in 1927. The club colours are white and Red . Their home stadium, Abed Hamdani Stadium, has a capacity of 8,000 spectators. The club is currently playing in the Algerian Ligue 2.

On 1 May 2020, AS Khroub promoted to the Algerian Ligue 2 .

On May 28, 2022, AS Khroub promoted to the Algerian Ligue 2.

References

External links 
 DZFoot.com Profile
 WorldfootballTravel.com Profile

Football clubs in Algeria
Constantine Province
Association football clubs established in 1927
Algerian Ligue Professionnelle 1 clubs
1927 establishments in Algeria
Sports clubs in Algeria